Ginés is a Spanish personal name.  It is the form of the Roman name "Genesius".

People with this name include:
Ginés de la Jara, Spanish saint of the Early Middle Ages

As a place name San Ginés can refer to:
San Ginés, Madrid, church in Madrid
San Ginés, Arrecife, church in Arrecife, Lanzarote
San Ginés, Guadalajara, church in Guadalajara, Spain

Other people with this personal name:
Ginés González García (1945- ), Minister of Health and Environment of Argentina
Ginés Pérez de Hita (1544-ca. 1605), Spanish novelist and poet
Ginés de Mafra (1493-1546), Spanish explorer
Ginés Pérez de la Parra (ca. 1548-1600), Valencian composer

Notes

Spanish masculine given names